Robert Sweet may refer to:
 Robert Sweet (botanist) (1783–1835), English botanist, horticulturist, and ornithologist
 Robert W. Sweet (1922–2019), U.S. federal judge
 Robert Sweet (musician) (born 1960), American drummer

See also 
 Sweet (surname)